Tirthan Wildlife Sanctuary is located in Himachal Pradesh, India. It is situated near the banks of the Tirthan river. The sanctuary has densely forested areas and various varieties of fauna living there. Tirthan Wildlife Sanctuary was in the top five Best Managed Protected Areas of India as per the Management Effectiveness Evaluation.

Location 
Tirthan Wildlife Sanctuary is situated in the district of Kullu, Himachal Pradesh. The sanctuary is connected to the Great Himalayan National Park as well. It is located at an altitude of 2,100 m to 4,900 m. Tirthan Wildlife Sanctuary can be reached by direct buses and taxis from Shimla and Chandigarh to Kullu.

Flora and fauna 
The sanctuary is situated at a high altitude. It has a variety ‌of ‌forested areas such as Ban Oak Forest, Kharsu Oak Forest, Coniferous Forest, Deodar Forest, etc. Other important wildlife includes the Snow Leopard, Musk Deer, Barking Deer, Asiatic Brown Bear, and Kashmir Flying Squirrel. Tirthan Wildlife Sanctuary is also a protected area for the preservation of the Himalayan Tahr.

References 

Wildlife sanctuaries in Himachal Pradesh